Thirty Three is a 1965 Soviet comedy film directed by Georgiy Daneliya.

Plot
Travkin, a kind and unassuming food chemist from a small Russian town, spends his time developing new carbonated soft drinks, and also sings in an amateur choir. But when a dentist discovers that Travkin has 33 teeth, he suddenly becomes a national celebrity. He is brought to Moscow as a medical phenomenon and studied by famous scientists; it is proclaimed that Travkin's 33rd tooth is unique, and may connect him to extraterrestrials from Mars. Travkin struggles with his celebrity status, is briefly confined to a psychiatric institution due to slander of a jealous man, and has to fend off gold digging women, sycophant men, and journalists. The only respite he finds is in his roommate at a hotel, who is a friendly, earnest industrial diver on a holiday. Finally, Travkin is selected for a space mission, to be sent to Mars via teleportation. After a heroic goodbye and a countdown, the entire celebrity plot turns out to be a dream. Travkin is immensely relieved and returns to his quiet and fulfilling life with renewed joy.

Cast
 Yevgeny Leonov as Ivan Travkin
 Nonna Mordyukova as Galina Pristyazhnyuk
 Lyubov Sokolova as Travkin's wife
 Viktor Avdyushko as Misha
 Saveliy Kramarov as Rodion Homutov
 Gennadi Yalovich as Scheremetyev	
 Nikolai Parfyonov as Prokhorov
 Maria Vinogradova as Margarita Pavlovna
 Inna Churikova as Rosa
 Arkadi Trusov as Ivanov		
 Vyacheslav Nevinny as Vasili
 Vladimir Basov as Museum boss
 Frunzik Mkrtchyan as  Professor Bruk
 Rita Gladunko	
 Sergei Martinson as Rosa's father
 Irina Skobtseva as Vera Sergeyevna		
 Svetlana Svetlichnaya as TV worker
 Yuri Sarantsev as Taxi driver
 Pyotr Shcherbakov as philosopher

External links

1965 films
1965 comedy films
Soviet comedy films
Russian comedy films
Mosfilm films
Soviet black-and-white films
Films directed by Georgiy Daneliya
Films scored by Andrey Petrov
Russian black-and-white films
1960s Russian-language films